Adrar Stadium (Adrar for "mountain" in Berber) (Berber: ⴰⴱⴰⵔⴰⵣ ⵏ ⴰⴷⵔⴰⵔ, Arabic: ملعب أدرار) is a multi-use stadium in Agadir, Morocco, that was inaugurated in 2013.  It is used mostly for football matches.  The stadium has a capacity of 45,480 seat. It was supposed to hold 2010 FIFA World Cup games if Morocco had been chosen to be the host country.  The stadium is home to Association football club Hassania Agadir, replacing their old venue Stade Al Inbiaâte. It has hosted four matches of the 2013 FIFA Club World Cup in December 2013 and was one of the stadiums to be used for the 2015 Africa Cup of Nations but did not host the cup because of Morocco's cancelled hosting due to fears of the Ebola outbreak. It was one of the 14 venues for Morocco's bid for the 2026 FIFA World Cup, it would have hosted a Quarters-Final if Morocco had have been awarded the World Cup.

The stadium was inaugurated on October 11, 2013, with a friendly match between local side Hassania Agadir and Algerian club JS Kabylie. Hassania's Saad Lemti scored the first goal in the stadium in the 76th minute of the match, as the hosts went on to win the match 1–0.

References

External links

Graphic of stadium 
Stadium Guide Article

Football venues in Morocco
Athletics (track and field) venues in Morocco
Sport in Agadir
Buildings and structures in Agadir
Hassania Agadir